is a railway station in the city of Hachinohe, Aomori Prefecture, Japan, operated by East Japan Railway Company (JR East).

Lines
Shirogane Station is served by the Hachinohe Line, and is 10.3 kilometers from the starting point of the line at Hachinohe Station.

Station layout
The station has a single ground-level side platform serving one bi-directional track. There is a small rain shelter built on top of the platform, but there is no station building. The station is unattended.

History
Shirogane Station was opened on June 1, 1934 as a station on the Japanese Government Railways (JGR). With the privatization of Japanese National Railways (JNR, the post-war successor to the JGR) on April 1, 1987, it came under the operational control of JR East. The station has been unattended since December 10, 2005.

Surrounding area
Hachinohe Kita high School
Hachinohe Fishing Port

See also
 List of Railway Stations in Japan

External links

  

Railway stations in Aomori Prefecture
Railway stations in Japan opened in 1934
Hachinohe Line
Hachinohe
Stations of East Japan Railway Company